Duvvasi Mohan is an Indian actor who is known for acting in comic roles, primarily in Telugu films. He is from Jagtial. He entered Tollywood as a producer, but later turned to acting and appeared in comedy roles in over 350 films.

Partial filmography
Duvvasi Mohan has appeared in comic roles in following Telugu films.
 
 Circus Sattipandu (1997)
  Korukunna Priyudu (1997)
  Chiranjeevulu (2001)
  Jayam (2002)
  Sambaram (2003)
  Okariki Okaru (2003)
  Inspector (2003)
  Lakshmi Narasimha (2004)
  Abhi (2004)
  Naa Autograph (2004)
  Tapana (2004)
  Jai  	 (2004)
  Ammayi Bagundi (2004)
  Sakhiya (2004)
  Avunanna Kaadanna (2005)
  Maayajaalam (2006)
  Samanyudu (2006)
  Oka V Chitram (2006)
  Tata Birla Madhyalo Laila (2006)
  Athili sathibabu lkg (2007)
  Bahumathi (2007)
  Somberi (2008)
  Original (2009)
  Lakshmi Putrudu (2009)
  Pistha... (2009)
  Snehituda... (2009)
  Saradaga Kasepu (2010)
  Kathi Kantha Rao (2010)
  Srimati Kalyanam (2010)
  Collector Gari Bharya (2010)
  Seeta Ramula Kalyanam (2010)
  Prathi Roju (2010)
  Oosaravelli (2011)
  Jayammu Nischayammuraa (2011)
  All The Best (2012)
  Nagaram Lo Vinayakudu (2012)
  Made In Vizag (2013)
  Athadu Aame O Scooter (2013)
  Bakara (2013)
  Gola Seenu (2013)
  Gunde Jaari Gallanthayyinde (2013)
  Ade Nuvvu Ade Nenu (2013)
  Alibaba Okkade Donga (2014)
  Cut Chesthe (2014)
  Yuddham (2014)
  Race Gurram (2014)
  Jump Jilani (2014)
  Manasa Thulli Padake (2014)
  Pilla Nuvvu Leni Jeevitam (2014)
  Paisa (2014)
  Pyar Mein Padipoyane (2014)
  Modhodu (2015)
  Band Baaja (2015)
   Bengal Tiger (2015)
  Chettukinda Pellikoduku  	 (2016)
  Ramudu Manchi Baludu (2016)
  Mano Balam (2016)
  Parvathipuram (2016)
  Band Balu (2017)
  Tamasha (2017)
  Radha (2017)
 Nakshatram (2017)
  Geetha Govindam (2018)
  Saaho (2019; Hindi, Telugu)
  Nuvvu Thopu Raa (2019)
 Sita (2019)
 90ML (2019)
 F2: Fun and Frustration (2019)
 Alludu Adhurs (2021)
 Ek Mini Katha  (2021)
 Maestro (2021)
 Induvadana (2022)
 F3 (2022)
 Like, Share & Subscribe (2022)
 Macherla Niyojakavargam (2022)
 Veera Simha Reddy (2023)
 Das Ka Dhamki'' (2023)

References

External links
 

Telugu comedians
Telugu male actors
Living people
Year of birth missing (living people)
Male actors in Telugu cinema
Indian male comedians
21st-century Indian male actors
20th-century Indian male actors
Indian male film actors
Male actors from Andhra Pradesh